1000 Days of Syria is a hypertext-based historical fiction game centered on the first 1000 days of the Syrian Civil War. Created in 2014 by Mitch Swenson, it is considered to be one of the first examples of an electronic literature newsgame.

References

External links 
 

2014 video games
Indie video games
Browser games
2010s interactive fiction
Works about the Syrian civil war
Government simulation video games
Video games developed in the United States

Electronic literature works
Single-player video games